John Gillett Oglesby (March 19, 1873 – May 27, 1938) was the 29th and 31st Lieutenant Governor of Illinois from 1909 to 1913, during this time he served under Governor Charles S. Deneen, and again from 1917 to 1921 serving under Governor Frank O. Lowden.

Born in Decatur, Illinois, on March 19, 1873, he was the son of Illinois Governor Richard James Oglesby and Emma Gillet Oglesby, a member of the prominent Oglesby political family of Kentucky and Illinois. Oglesby served in the United States Army during the Spanish–American War and was a member of Illinois House of Representatives in 1905. He served as lieutenant governor for two non-consecutive terms, from 1909 to 1913 and from 1917 to 1921. (He ran for reelection after his first term in 1912 and was defeated).

He was a candidate in the Republican primary for governor in 1920 and in 1936. Oglesby was a delegate from Illinois to the Republican National Conventions in 1920, 1924, 1928, and 1932.

Oglesby was a delegate to the Illinois convention to ratify the Twenty-first Amendment to the United States Constitution in 1933.

He died near Elkhart in Logan County, Illinois, and is interred at Elkhart Cemetery.

See also
1908 Illinois lieutenant gubernatorial election
1912 Illinois lieutenant gubernatorial election
1916 Illinois lieutenant gubernatorial election

References

External links 

 Illinois State House Portraits of Lieutenant Governors

1873 births
1938 deaths
American people of Scottish descent
People from Decatur, Illinois
Military personnel from Illinois
United States Army soldiers
American military personnel of the Spanish–American War
Republican Party members of the Illinois House of Representatives
Lieutenant Governors of Illinois